Tortoiseshell is a cat coat coloring named for its similarity to tortoiseshell material. Like calicoes, tortoiseshell cats are almost exclusively female. Male tortoiseshells are rare and are usually sterile.

Tortoiseshell cats, or torties, combine two colors other than white, either closely mixed or in larger patches. The colors are often described as red and black, but the "red" patches can instead be orange, yellow, or cream, and the "black" can instead be chocolate, gray, tabby, or blue. Tortoiseshell cats with the tabby pattern as one of their colors are sometimes referred to as torbies or torbie cats.

"Tortoiseshell" is typically reserved for particolored cats with relatively small or no white markings. Those that are predominantly white with tortoiseshell patches are described as tricolor, tortoiseshell-and-white (in the United Kingdom), or calico (in Canada and the United States). 

Cats with a tortoiseshell pattern and small blotches of white are sometimes referred to as "tortico," a portmanteau of "tortie" and "calico."

Tortie cats with a predominantly white undercoat are often referred to as "caliby," a portmanteau of "calico" and "tabby." 

Tortoiseshell markings appear in many different breeds, as well as in non-purebred domestic cats. This pattern is especially preferred in the Japanese Bobtail breed, and exists in the Cornish Rex group.

Patterns 

Tortoiseshell cats have particolored coats with patches of various shades of red and black, and sometimes white. The size of the patches can vary from a fine speckled pattern to large areas of color. Typically, the more white a cat has, the more solid the patches of color. Dilution genes may modify the coloring, lightening the fur to a mix of cream and blue, lilac or fawn; the markings on tortoiseshell cats are usually asymmetrical.

Occasionally tabby patterns of black and brown (eumelanistic) and red (phaeomelanistic) colors are also seen. These patched tabbies are often called a tortie-tabby, a torbie or, with large white areas, a caliby. Not uncommonly there will be a "split face" pattern with black on one side of the face and orange on the other, with a dividing line running down the bridge of the nose. Tortoiseshell coloring can also be expressed in the point pattern, referred to as a tortie point.

Genetics 

Leonard Doncaster was the first to prove that tortoiseshell is the female heterozygote of orange and black, the corresponding male being orange. In the course of his studies he discovered that the rare tortoiseshell male is often sterile.

Tortoiseshell and calico coats result from an interaction between genetic and developmental factors. The primary gene for coat color (B) for the colors brown, chocolate, cinnamon, etc., can be masked by the co-dominant gene for the orange color (O) which is on the X Chromosome and has two alleles, the orange (XO) and not-orange (Xo), that produce orange phaeomelanin and black eumelanin pigments, respectively. (NOTE: Typically, the X for the chromosome is assumed from context and the alleles are referred to by just the uppercase O for the orange, or lower case o for the not-orange.)  The tortoiseshell and calico cats are indicated: Oo to indicate they are heterozygous on the O gene.  The (B) and (O) genes can be further modified by a recessive dilute gene (dd) which softens the colors.  Orange becomes cream, black becomes gray, etc.  Various terms are used for specific colors, for example, gray is also called blue, orange is also called ginger.  Therefore, a tortoiseshell cat may be a chocolate tortoiseshell or a blue/cream tortoiseshell or the like, based on the alleles for the (B) and (D) genes.

The cells of female cats, which like other mammalian females have two X chromosomes (XX), undergo the phenomenon of X-inactivation, in which one or the other of the X-chromosomes is turned off at random in each cell in very early development. The inactivated X becomes a Barr body. Cells in which the chromosome carrying the orange (O) allele is inactivated express the alternative non-orange (o) allele, determined by the (B) gene. Cells in which the non-orange (o) allele is inactivated express the orange (O) allele. Pigment genes are expressed in melanocytes that migrate to the skin surface later in development. In bi-colored tortoiseshell cats, the melanocytes arrive relatively early, and the two cell types become intermingled, producing the characteristic brindled appearance consisting of an intimate mixture of orange and black cells, with occasional small diffuse spots of orange and black.

In tri-colored calico cats, a separate gene interacts developmentally with the coat color gene. This spotting gene produces white, unpigmented patches by delaying the migration of the melanocytes to the skin surface. There are a number of alleles of this gene that produce greater or lesser delays. The amount of white is artificially divided into mitted, bicolor, harlequin, and van, going from almost no white to almost completely white. In the extreme case, no melanocytes make it to the skin and the cat is entirely white (but not an albino). In intermediate cases, melanocyte migration is slowed, so that the pigment cells arrive late in development and have less time to intermingle. Observation of tri-color cats will show that, with a little white color, the orange and black patches become more defined, and with still more white, the patches become completely distinct. Each patch represents a clone of cells derived from one original cell in the early embryo.

A male cat, like males of other therian mammals, has only one X and one Y chromosome (XY). That X chromosome does not undergo X-inactivation, and coat color is determined by which allele is present on the X chromosome. Accordingly, the cat's coat will be either entirely orange or non-orange. Very rarely (approximately 1 in 3,000) a male tortoiseshell or calico is born; these typically have an extra X chromosome (XXY), a condition known in humans as Klinefelter syndrome, and their cells undergo an X-inactivation process like in females. As in humans, these cats often are sterile because of the imbalance in sex chromosomes. Some male calico or tortoiseshell cats may be chimeras, which result from fusion in early development of two (fraternal twin) embryos with different color genotypes; these torties can pass only one color to their offspring, not both, according to which of the two original embryos its testes are descended from. Others are mosaics, in which the XXY condition arises after conception and the cat is a mixture of cells with different numbers of X chromosomes.

Gallery

Folklore 

In the folklore of several cultures, cats with tortoiseshell coloration are believed to bring good luck.  In Ireland, tortoiseshell cats are considered to bring good luck to their owners.  In the United States, tortoiseshells are sometimes referred to as money cats.  In Japan, tortoiseshell cats are considered to bring good luck against shipwrecks.   There are some additional interpretations of the luck of tortoiseshell cats, such as the one in England that describes an announcement of misfortune when a strange tortoiseshell cat enters a house.  In England, if a woman dreams of a tortoiseshell cat, it can be interpreted as a warning that she should take care of her so-called friends.

Behavior 
One study found that tortoiseshell owners frequently believe their cats have increased attitude ("tortitude"), affectionately described as “the divas of the cat world” because they typically like things done their way and have a quick temper when crossed. There is, however, little existing scientific evidence on the matter.  One study found that there was not a relationship between coat color and tameness.  However, a 2015 study from the University of California, Davis School of Veterinary Medicine surveying more than 1,200 cat guardians established links between a tortoiseshell coat pattern and a cat's inclination towards hissing, biting, chasing, and slapping/scratching their human companions, while a 2016 study showed an association with increased aggression and prey interest. According to celebrity cat expert Jackson Galaxy, tortoiseshell cats tend to have much more distinct personalities and are more sensitive to environmental stimuli.   Based on the varying study results, assumptions cannot be made between cat coat color and personality.  However, with some animals, such as domestic horses, silver foxes, deer mice, and rats, there are associations between personality and coat color and more research is needed to see if there is such an association in cats.

See also 
 Calico cat
 Deaf white cat
 Tabby cat

Notes

References

 Atkins, Carla. Cats: An Owner's Guide (2003). San Diego, California: Thunder Bay Press.

External links 

 "Tortoiseshell Cat Tortoiseshell Color Pattern, Tortie Cat" at animal-world.com
 Tortoiseshell and tri-color cats
 Calico cat
 tortiecats.free.fr, website showing the diversity of tortie and calico coats

Cat coat types